Luis Alegre (c. 1510 – 1573) was a Flemish soldier, in the service of the Spanish Crown, who served as conquistador and expeditionary of the Río de la Plata and Paraguay.

Biography 
He arrived at the Río de la Plata in the expedition of Pedro de Mendoza in 1534, and later to Asunción, aboard the ship "La Marañona" in 1538. He changed his original last name "Plesier" to Alegre, and attended the election of Domingo Martinez de Irala as Lieutenant Governor of Paraguay in 1539. He had an active participation in the Conquest of Paraguay, receiving parcels of land, in addition to the distributions of various indigenous tribes as encomiendas for their services to the Crown.

He was married to Magdalena Testanova, daughter of Blas Testanova, the first doctor of the Río de la Plata. He remarriage with Catalina Lys, daughter of flemish conquistador Dionis de Lys. They had a son named Esteban Alegre, a neighbor founder of Corrientes and Buenos Aires.

His last name is very common in Paraguay, and the Argentine coastal area, but a distinguished line can be drawn through Captain Casimiro Alegre, a military man with a long career during the colonial and post-colonial period of Buenos Aires.

References

External links 
iaa.fadu.uba.ar

16th-century explorers
Explorers of Argentina
Flemish diaspora
Flemish soldiers
People from Buenos Aires
Spanish colonial governors and administrators
1510s births
1573 deaths